Wildsee is a small tarn within a cirque in the Black Forest near Baiersbronn, Germany. It is part of the Black Forest National Park and the Wilder See - Hornisgrinde Nature Reserve.

Lakes of Baden-Württemberg
Tarns of the Black Forest
LWildsee